The 2006 United States House of Representatives election in Delaware was held on November 7, 2006.  Incumbent Republican U.S. Representative Mike Castle won re-election to a seventh term.

Democratic primary

Candidates
Dennis Spivack, attorney
Karen M. Hartley-Nagle, non-profit organization director

Republican primary
 Michael N. Castle, incumbent U.S. Congressman

Congressman Castle faced no opposition in the Republican Party primary.

Green Party
 Michael Berg, retired teacher and anti-war activist

Independent
Karen M. Hartley-Nagle, formerly of the Democratic Party

General election

Results

References

Delaware

2006
2006 Delaware elections